Rex Robert Brown (born July 27, 1964) is an American musician. He is best known as the longtime bassist for heavy metal band Pantera, having joined the band in 1982. Brown is also a former member of the heavy metal supergroup Down (2001–2011) and the former bassist for Kill Devil Hill. He released his debut solo album Smoke on This… in 2017. For the first time in Brown's career, the work features him not only as a bassist but also as lead vocalist and guitarist.

Brown authored a book called Official Truth 101 Proof, which was released in April 2013. The book documents Pantera's formation, career, and disbandment.

Early life
Rex Robert Brown was born in Graham, Texas, on July 27, 1964. His father was 40 when Brown was born, and died in 1971. He was raised by his mother and sister. Brown was first introduced to music through his grandmother, who taught him to play the piano when he was a child, and turned him onto ragtime music and Scott Joplin. Brown was a member of the Boy Scouts of America and achieved the rank of Eagle Scout. Brown became a fan of ZZ Top and Def Leppard as a youth, and started playing bass when he was twelve years old. He remains a fan of Black Sabbath, Led Zeppelin, and hardcore punk.

Career

Pantera

Pantera was formed in 1981. Brown joined Pantera on bass in 1982 replacing Tommy D. Bradford and adopting the alias "Rex Rocker". Brown was a classmate of, and played in the high school jazz band with, drummer Vinnie Paul, and guitarist Dimebag Darrell (then known as Diamond Darrell). Brown was credited as "Rex Rocker" on Pantera's first four  albums: Metal Magic (1983), Projects in the Jungle (1984), I Am the Night (1985), and Power Metal (1988), he would be credited by his birth name starting with the band's fifth album Cowboys from Hell and onwards.

Pantera recruited vocalist Phil Anselmo to replace Terry Glaze in 1986. With Anselmo taking over as the new frontman, the band's fourth album, Power Metal, was released in 1988. In 1989, the band was signed with Atco Records, and released their fifth album, Cowboys from Hell in the following year, which proved to be the band's turning point to commercial success. Over the course of the band's walkthrough in the 1990s decade, Pantera released four more studio albums, Vulgar Display of Power (1992), Far Beyond Driven (1994), The Great Southern Trendkill (1996), and Reinventing the Steel (2000). After releases of a 1997 live album and a greatest hits compilation, Pantera was nominated for four best metal performance Grammys, for "I'm Broken", "Suicide Note Pt. I", "Cemetery Gates", and "Revolution Is My Name".

In 2001, Pantera went on what at the time was believed to be a temporary hiatus, mainly due to Anselmo's focus on side projects. Pantera would officially disband in 2003.

In July 2022, it was announced that Brown would be joining Anselmo, along with Zakk Wylde and Charlie Benante (as the respective fill-ins of Dimebag Darrell and Vinnie Paul), for Pantera's first world tour in 22 years in 2023.

Down

In 1998, during his stay in Louisiana, he was invited by Phil Anselmo for a jam session that included all the members of Down except their bass player Todd Strange, who left the band. That night they ended up writing several demos for what later became their second album recorded in the fall of 2001 at Anselmo's barn that had been transformed into a professional studio. The album was released on March 26, 2002, and became the first Down release featuring Brown on bass. The band, however, went on hiatus again at the very end of 2002.

In 2006, the band reunited and started writing the material for their third studio album. Down III: Over the Under was released in 2007. The band toured as the opening act for Metallica. During that time, he became good friends with James Hetfield, who—similarly to Brown—completed an alcohol rehabilitation course back in 2002.

Wanting to explore different music, Brown left Down in 2011.

Other work

In 1999, Brown, Dimebag Darrell, and Vinnie Paul teamed up with country artist David Allan Coe in a project called Rebel Meets Rebel. This group released an album on May 2, 2006 on Vinnie Paul's Big Vin Records label.

Brown has worked previously with Jerry Cantrell on five tracks included on the album called Boggy Depot as well as eleven tracks with Crowbar on the album Lifesblood for the Downtrodden. He has also provided bass work for Crowbar in 2004 and 2005 and to Cavalera Conspiracy in 2008. Rex revealed his new project Arms of the Sun, a project also featuring John Luke Hebert (of King Diamond) on drums, Lance Harvill on vocals and guitar, and Ben Bunker (of Gryn) on guitar. The group has completed work on thirteen tracks at Willie Nelson's Pedernales Recording Studio in Austin, produced and mixed by Terry Date. In February 2011 it was announced that Brown had amicably left Arms of the Sun. A replacement bassist has not yet been announced.

In March 2011, it was announced that Brown had formed a new band, Kill Devil Hill with Vinny Appice (Heaven & Hell, Black Sabbath, Dio) on drums, Mark Zavon (RATT, W.A.S.P., 40 Cycle Hum) on guitar and Dewey Bragg (Pissing Razors) on vocals. The group has demoed around 10 songs, which, according to Appice, sound "like a cross between Black Sabbath, Alice in Chains and a little bit of Led Zeppelin thrown in. It's heavy, but with a lot of cool hooks and melodic overtones, too." Kill Devil Hill released their debut album in May 2012 to critical acclaim, and continue to tour in support of their music.

In 2013, Brown released an autobiography, titled Official Truth: 101 Proof, which chronicles his personal life and journey through Pantera, including the events leading to the band's disbandment.

In 2015, Brown penned the foreword to the book Survival of the Fittest: Heavy Metal in the 1990s, by author Greg Prato. Rex was also interviewed for the book (as well as his former bandmate in Pantera, Anselmo, among many others).

Brown's first solo album, Smoke on This…, was released on July 28, 2017 via Entertainment One.

Personal life
Brown does not "subscribe to any particular organized religion", though he says he believes in God and the Ten Commandments.

In August 2009, Brown was excluded from the Down tour due to acute pancreatitis. He then had his gallbladder and polyps on his pancreas removed. "Rex has been through hell, man", said bandmate Pepper Keenan. "He was cut from rib to rib and they cleaned him out, but he's in top shape again. After twenty-five years on the road – drinking every day and whatnot… well, the old days are over, my friend."

Playing style and equipment

Brown was a jazz bassist and was offered a scholarship by the University of North Texas, but declined. He often plays with a pick.

Brown was notable for often contributing walking basslines underneath Dimebag Darrell's guitar solos. Standout tracks include "Floods", "Walk", "5 Minutes Alone", "Throes of Rejection", "Cowboys from Hell", "Living Through Me (Hells' Wrath)", "I Can't Hide", "Use My Third Arm", "Where You Come From", "This Love", "I'm Broken", among others.

In Pantera's earliest days, Brown was witnessed playing an Ibanez Roadstar bass. In the late 1980s, he switched to Charvel basses and played a  white 5 string and a black 4 string model. He used these basses exclusively through the Cowboys from Hell and Vulgar Display of Power albums, before he briefly used a 4 and 5 string model Ernie Ball Music Man StingRay bass during the Vulgar Display of Power tour as well as a Fernandes Telecaster shaped bass for the "Walk" music video.

In 1993, Brown began endorsing Spector bass guitars. He continued to use Spectors until 2015, with his own signature model. Shaped somewhat similar to a Gibson Thunderbird, the Spector Rex Brown Signature bass comes in several different finishes and is available in 4 and 5 string models. In 2011, Spector released a new signature bass by Brown named the Spector RXT. The bass has the same electronics as his first signature bass but instead of a Thunderbird, it is shaped like a Telecaster. Although this was released to the market by Spector, it was originally intended to be released by ESP Guitars under the LTD banner. Several prototypes and pre-production models exist, some of which are owned by Brown and can be seen used while playing with Down in 2009.

After over 20 years of using Spector basses, Brown announced in 2015 that he had left Spector and is now a Warwick artist, by showing a photo of his new Warwick bass.

In 2021, Gibson released the Rex Brown Signature Thunderbird bass; with Rexbucker pickups.

Basses

Gibson Thunderbird - Black and gold 
 1989 Jackson USA Custom – 4 string white
 Spector Rex-5XL – Rex signature bass
 Custom Spector NS4-style bass
 Spector NS basses – 4 and 5 stringed model
 Fender Precision Bass – Used in studio.
 Fernandes "Telecaster" prototype basses – 4 and 5 stringed models
 Fernandes 8-string – Used in studio.

 Musicman Stingray basses – 4 and 5 stringed model
 ESP Surveyor basses (4&5 strings)
 Charvel basses – 850XL 4 string and Fusion 5 string
 Ibanez Roadstar bass – 4 string
 ESP/LTD REX-600 prototypes - ESP/LTD signature that never made it into production
 Ovation B778-5 – acoustic bass
 Warwick Rex Brown Reverso- Signature 4 string and 5 string.

Effects

 BOSS CH-1 Super Chorus
 Morley Pro Series 2 Bass Wah
 Korg DTR-1 Rack Tuner
 Korg DT-10 Tuner
 Korg Pitchblack Tuner
 Rocktron Basix Bass Preamp

 Ashdown Bass Chorus Plus
 MXR Phase 90
 HBE Hematoma 
 MXR Blowtorch Bass Distortion
 MXR Carbon Copy Delay
 BOSS CEB-3 Bass Chorus

Amplifiers

 Ampeg SVT-IVPRO Head
 Vintage Ampeg SVT Head
 Ampeg SVT-IIPro Head
 Ampeg SVT-II Head
 Hartke Kilo 1000 Watt Bass Head

 Ampeg SVT810AV Bass Cabinet / 8x10
 Ampeg SVT410HE Bass Cabinet / 4x10
 Ampeg SVT810E Bass Cabinet / 8x10
 Hartke HyDrive 8x10 Bass Cabinet / 8x10

Accessories
 EMG P-J Active bass pickups
 Ernie Ball Cobalt Hybrid Slinky bass strings (.45-.105)
 Dunlop Tortex 1.0mm guitar picks
 Dunlop Tortex 0.88mm guitar picks

Discography

Solo
2017 Smoke on This…
Pantera
1983 Metal Magic
1984 Projects in the Jungle
1985 I Am the Night
1988 Power Metal
1990 Cowboys from Hell
1992 Vulgar Display of Power
1994 Far Beyond Driven
1996 The Great Southern Trendkill
2000 Reinventing the Steel

Down
2002 Down II: A Bustle in Your Hedgerow
2007 Down III: Over the Under
2010 Diary of a Mad Band: Europe in the Year of VI CD/DVD
Crowbar
2005  Lifesblood for the Downtrodden
David Allan Coe and Cowboys from Hell
2006 Rebel Meets Rebel
Kill Devil Hill
2012 Kill Devil Hill
2013 Revolution Rise

Collaborations
1998 – Jerry Cantrell – Boggy Depot ("Dickeye", "My Song", "Keep the Light On", "Satisfy", and "Hurt a Long Time")
2008 – Cavalera Conspiracy – Inflikted ("Ultra-Violent")

References

External links

 Pantera's Rex Brown – Wikipedia: Fact or Fiction? on Loudwire.com

1964 births
American heavy metal bass guitarists
American male bass guitarists
Pantera members
Living people
People from Graham, Texas
Musicians from New Orleans
Musicians from Dallas
Writers from New Orleans
Guitarists from Louisiana
Guitarists from Texas
20th-century American guitarists
Down (band) members
American autobiographers
Crowbar (American band) members
Kill Devil Hill (band) members